Ceutorhynchus elegans is a species of true weevils in the tribe Ceutorhynchini. It has a palaearctic distribution.

References 

 Materials to the knowledge of Ceutorhynchinae (Coleoptera, Curculionidae) of Mongolia and the USSR. BA Korotyaev, Nasekomye Mongolii, 1980
 New and little known species of weevils from East Asia (Coleoptera: Apionidae, Curculionidae). B Korotyaev, Zoosystematica Rossica, 1997

External links 

 Ceutorhynchus elegans at insectoid.info

Ceutorhynchini
Beetles described in 1980